On the Platte River, Nebraska is an 1863 oil landscape painting by the Hudson River School artist Albert Bierstadt.

References

 

Paintings by Albert Bierstadt
1863 paintings
Water in art